Bernd Klingner (born 28 January 1940) is a German sport shooter who won a gold medal at the 1968 Summer Olympics in the small bore rifle, three positions event. He also competed at the 1960 Summer Olympics and the 1972 Summer Olympics.

References

1940 births
Living people
German male sport shooters
ISSF rifle shooters
Olympic shooters of the United Team of Germany
Olympic shooters of West Germany
Olympic gold medalists for West Germany
Olympic medalists in shooting
Shooters at the 1960 Summer Olympics
Shooters at the 1968 Summer Olympics
Shooters at the 1972 Summer Olympics
Medalists at the 1968 Summer Olympics
21st-century German people
20th-century German people